Phenakite is a Michelin Guide-starred restaurant in Los Angeles, California.

Reviews and accolades
Phenakite was named '2021 Restaurant of the Year' by the Los Angeles Times and included on the newspaper's 2020 list of '101 Best Los Angeles Restaurants'. The business was awarded a Michelin star in 2021.  In an October 2021 article, Variety reported that Phenakite had more than 20,000 people waiting to get reservations.

See also 

 List of Michelin starred restaurants in Los Angeles and Southern California

References

External links
 

Asian restaurants in Los Angeles
Michelin Guide starred restaurants in California